James Winstanley ( 1667 – 22 January 1719) was a British lawyer and Tory politician.

Born around 1667, James was the only son of Clement Winstanley of Braunstone Hall and his wife Catherine, the daughter of Sir Francis Willoughby of Wollaton Hall. He was educated at Jesus College, Cambridge, matriculating in 1684, and admitted to Gray's Inn on 4 February 1688. Around 1701 he married Frances Holt, daughter of James Holt of Castleton, Lancashire, with whom he had two sons and six daughters.

He was elected a  Member of Parliament for Leicester in the second general election of 1701, and served until his death on 22 January 1719, aged 51.

References

 

1667 births
1719 deaths
Alumni of Jesus College, Cambridge
Members of Gray's Inn
English MPs 1701–1702
English MPs 1702–1705
English MPs 1705–1707
Members of the Parliament of Great Britain for English constituencies
British MPs 1707–1708
British MPs 1708–1710
British MPs 1710–1713
British MPs 1713–1715
British MPs 1715–1722